Victor Stanley Howe (November 2, 1929 – January 31, 2015) was a Canadian professional ice hockey right wing. He played 33 games in the National Hockey League with the New York Rangers between 1951 and 1955. The rest of his career, which lasted from 1948 to 1957, was spent in various minor leagues. Howe's brother, Gordie, and nephews Mark and Marty all played in the NHL as well; both Gordie and Mark are in the Hockey Hall of Fame.

Life and career
Howe was born to Ab and Katherine Howe as one of nine children. He was raised in Saskatoon and played most of his career in the minor leagues, and played 33 games in the National Hockey League over three seasons in the 1950s.

Howe retired after the 1956–57 season in the British National League, but returned to hockey for the 1961–62 season with the Moncton Beavers of the Nova Scotia Senior Hockey League a senior league in New Brunswick.

Post-playing career
Howe retired from hockey in 1957 to work as  a constable with the Canadian National Railway Police in Moncton, New Brunswick. He died on January 31, 2015.

Howe retired from CN and lived in Moncton until his death. He was predeceased by wife Jaquie (2007) and daughter Vicki (2014), as well as two brothers and three sisters. He was survived by brother Gordie and sister Helen Cummine of Saskatoon.

Career statistics

Regular season and playoffs

Source:

References

External links
 

1929 births
2015 deaths
Brandon Regals players
Canadian expatriate ice hockey players in the United States
Canadian ice hockey right wingers
Canadian people of English descent
Cincinnati Mohawks (AHL) players
Detroit Hettche players
Harringay Racers players
Ice hockey people from Saskatchewan
New York Rangers players
New York Rovers players
Saskatoon Quakers players
Sportspeople from Saskatoon
Valleyfield Braves players
Vancouver Canucks (WHL) players
Windsor Spitfires players